Laughing Apartment Near Girinagar is a 2018 Indian Malayalam-language comedy film written and directed by Nissar and co-written by P Parappuram. The film stars Ramesh Pisharody and Dharmajan Bolgatty.

Cast

 Ramesh Pisharody as Aravindan
 Dharmajan Bolgatty as Kunjan
 Anjana Appukuttan
 Aswathi Menon as Manju
 Geetha Vijayan as Bala
K. T. S. Padannayil
 Kalabhavan Shajohn as Rahul
 Kottayam Nazeer as Appavi Security 
Ponnamma Babu
 Saju Kodiyan as Sudhakaran
 Salim Kumar as Thankarajan
Sunil Sukhada as Swamy
Pradeep Kottayam
Saranya Anand

Release

The film was scheduled for release on 17 August 2018, but was postponed because of Kerala floods issue. The film later released on 24 August 2018 (India).

References

External links
 

2010s Malayalam-language films
Indian comedy films